Superman: Red Son is a three-issue prestige format comic book mini-series published by DC Comics that was released under their Elseworlds imprint in 2003. Author Mark Millar created the comic with the premise "What if Superman had been raised in the Soviet Union?" It received critical acclaim and was nominated for the 2004 Eisner Award for best limited series.

The story mixes alternate versions of DC super-heroes with alternate-reality versions of real political figures such as Joseph Stalin and John F. Kennedy. The series spans approximately 1953–2001, save for a futuristic epilogue.

In Red Son, Superman's rocket ship lands on a Ukrainian collective farm rather than in Kansas. As an adult he becomes state-sponsored superhero whose civilian identity is kept a state secret, and who in Soviet radio broadcasts, is described not as fighting for "truth, justice, and the American Way", but as "the Champion of the common worker who fights a never-ending battle for Stalin, socialism, and the international expansion of the Warsaw Pact".

Publication history
The ideas that made up the story came together over a long stretch of time. Millar said:

By 1992, he had already developed many of the plot points:

Grant Morrison has given interviews about giving Mark Millar the idea of sending Superman back to the past, as was used in the end of Red Son.

Certain images from the series are taken from famous comic book covers or panels. A splash panel from the first issue references Superman's pose on the cover of Superman #1. Another panel showing riots in the U.S. mimics the cover to Action Comics #1, which was the first appearance of Superman.

Plot
The Soviet Union reveals Superman to the world in 1953. The news of a superpowered alien under Soviet control causes panic in the United States, shifting the focus of the Cold War arms race from nuclear weapons to metahumans. CIA agent James Olsen recruits Lex Luthor, a scientist employed by S.T.A.R. Labs, to destroy Superman. Luthor's first act is to cause Sputnik 2 to plummet towards Metropolis. After Superman diverts the satellite away from the city, Luthor retrieves his genetic material and creates a monstrous clone of Superman, whom Lex Luthor names Superman 2.

Meanwhile, Superman meets Wonder Woman at a diplomatic party, and she becomes smitten with him. Pyotr Roslov, the head of the NKVD and Joseph Stalin's illegitimate son, is angry that Superman has turned his father's attention away from him and ended his chances of advancement within the Soviet regime. Pyotr shoots a dissident couple in front of their son for printing anti-Superman propaganda. Stalin dies from cyanide poisoning, and Superman initially refuses command of the Communist Party. However, a chance meeting with Lana Lazarenko, his childhood sweetheart, changes his mind. Superman chooses to use his powers for the greater good and turn his country into a utopia.

The U.S. government sends "Superman 2" to engage Superman, and their duel causes an accidental nuclear missile launch in Great Britain. The clone sacrifices itself to save millions. Luthor murders his research staff at S.T.A.R. Labs and founds LuthorCorp, dedicating his life to destroying Superman.

By 1978, the United States is on the verge of social collapse whereas the prosperous Soviet Union has peacefully expanded its influence to nearly every corner of the globe. The cost of this progress is an increased infringement on individual liberties, with Superman fast becoming a Big Brother-like figure, and the introduction of a brain surgery technique that turns dissidents into obedient drones, or "Superman Robots". Superman now works with Wonder Woman to save lives as well as govern the Soviet state. Wonder Woman has become increasingly enamored of Superman, but he considers her simply as a comrade, and is oblivious to her love for him.

Luthor plans to shrink Moscow, but this plan fails when Brainiac, his collaborator, shrinks Stalingrad instead. Superman intervenes and retrieves both Brainiac's central processing unit and the tiny city, putting an end to the Brainiac-Luthor cooperation. He is unable to restore Stalingrad and its inhabitants to their proper size. This becomes his one failure and a source of great guilt.

Luthor's third plan involves the vigilante Batman, who was the boy orphaned by Pyotr. Batman joins forces with LuthorCorp and Pyotr, now head of the KGB. They capture Wonder Woman and use her as bait for Superman, hoping to sap his powers with rays that imitate sunlight from Superman's home planet. The plan works, but Superman convinces Wonder Woman to break free of the lasso that she is tied up with and destroy the generators running the lamps emitting the solar energy. She does, severely injuring herself in the process, but the lamps stop running and Superman's powers return. Scared that Superman was going to lobotomize him and turn him into a robot, Batman kills himself as a martyr to his cause. Pyotr is turned into a Superman robot, and Wonder Woman no longer has feelings for Superman, as he shows little to no regard for her injured condition.

Luthor enacts his fourth plan when he finds a mysterious green lantern in an alien ship that crashed at Roswell, New Mexico. Brainiac is reprogrammed into Superman's aide, and the construction of a Fortress of Solitude, located in Siberia and referred to as "The Winter Palace", begins. Superman's reign continues with no crime, poverty, or unemployment, but with an ever-present state authority. Superman is committed to "winning the argument" with the U.S., and repeatedly refuses Brainiac's suggestions of an invasion. Stalingrad remains his one failure, now contained within a protective glass "bottle".

In 2001, the U.S. elects Luthor and Olsen as President and Vice President, respectively. Using his scientific expertise, massive economic capital and dictatorial powers, Luthor returns prosperity to his country. This is only a part of a more general plan to provoke Superman into invading the United States. Luthor shows Olsen two of his greatest discoveries: the Phantom Zone, a place that super-hearing cannot reach; and the Green Lantern Corps.

Luthor confronts Superman in the Winter Palace. Brainiac yanks Luthor deep into the recesses of the Fortress to be converted surgically into a Superman Robot, claiming that Lex would convince Superman to commit suicide in less than 14 minutes. Superman agrees that his hand has been forced, and prepares to attack.

First Lady Lois Luthor visits Paradise Island to forge an alliance with the Amazon empire, now ruled by an embittered and vengeful Wonder Woman. Superman attacks the East Coast, confronting and defeating the Green Lantern Marine Corps, which is led by Colonel Hal Jordan. The Amazon forces, commanded by Wonder Woman, attack Superman but are quickly defeated, along with a collection of "super-menaces" (including the Atomic Skull, the Parasite and Doomsday) that Luthor had put together over the years. Brainiac's spaceship cuts the U.S. Pacific Fleet to pieces, and the two superbeings meet at the White House. They are greeted by Lois Luthor with the last weapon, a small note written by Lex that reads: "Why don't you just put the whole world in a bottle, Superman?"

Realizing he has meddled in affairs that he had no place in, Superman orders Brainiac to end the invasion. Brainiac, however, reveals it has never been under Superman's control, and instead attacks Superman with green radiation. Brainiac is shut down from inside by Luthor, who evaded the surgery. As the singularities powering Brainiac's ship threaten to collapse, Superman rockets it into space, where it explodes. The Earth is saved, but Superman is apparently dead.

The Soviet Union falls into chaos, but is soon brought back under control thanks to the Batmen (resistance members who began wearing the costume after Batman's death). Luthor integrates many of Superman's and Brainiac's ideas into the new philosophy of "Luthorism" and forms a "Global United States". This becomes the defining moment for mankind's future as it enters an unprecedented age of peace and stability. A benevolent world government is formed and maintained. Luthor presides over a string of scientific achievements, including the curing of all known disease, and colonization of the solar system. Luthor lives for over 1,000 years.

At Luthor's funeral, it is revealed that Superman survived the explosion of Brainiac's ship and is apparently immortal. Superman attends the funeral wearing a business suit and thick glasses essentially identical to the appearance of Clark Kent, an identity he never adopted in this timeline. Luthor's widow, Lois, sees this mysterious figure in the crowd and, other than an eerie sense of deja vu, suspects nothing. Superman walks quietly away from the ceremony, planning to live among humans rather than ruling over them.

Billions of years in the future, Earth is being torn apart by tidal stresses from the sun, which has become a red giant. Luthor's distant descendant, Jor-L, sends his infant son, Kal-L, rocketing back into the past. The final panels of the comic book depict the landing of Kal-L's timeship in a Ukrainian collective in 1938, effectively causing a predestination paradox (and, thus, making Superman a descendant of Luthor and Lois).

Collected editions

In 2004 the story was collected into a 160-page trade paperback. (Titan Books, March 2004)

In 2009, it was collected into a 168-page hardcover Deluxe Edition. (Titan Books, December 2009)

In other DC Comics
In The New 52 (a reboot of DC's continuity), the alternate Earth depicted in Superman: Red Son has been designated Earth-30. The Superman of Earth-30 also appeared in the Countdown: Arena series in 2007, in which he came into conflict with the Cold War U.S.-based Supermen of Earth-31 (The Dark Knight Returns) and Earth-15 (Chris Kent). In 2008, Earth-30 and its Soviet Superman also appeared in the Countdown to Final Crisis: The Search for Ray Palmer storyline, where it was one of the alternate Earths visited by Jason Todd, Donna Troy and Kyle Rayner to locate Earth-0's absent Atom (Ray Palmer). Characters from Superman: Red Son also appeared in the Action Comics and Detective Comics tie-ins to the "Convergence" storyline, in which they are forced to fight against the heroes from the original Earth-Two's Metropolis. A promotional comic, Kentucky Fried Chicken Presents: The Colonel Corps had the Colonel Sanders of Earth-30 ("Comrade Sanders") joining with Colonels from other universes to take on Earth-3's evil Colonel Sanders. This Sanders wore an ushanka.

In the alternate 1940 setting of DC Comics Bombshells, Stargirl and Supergirl are both Soviet aviators in the Night Witches, which was seen as a nod to Superman: Red Son.

In March 2018, the Batman featured in this story made a cameo appearance in the sixth issue of the Dark Nights: Metal comic book series.

Merchandise
Figures based on characters from the series include Superman, Wonder Woman, Batman, President Superman and Green Lantern. A boxset was released in 2008 featuring Superman, Wonder Woman, Batman, and a remolded Bizarro.

In other media

Live action

Television
 The fourth season of Supergirl adapts concepts from the story. In the third season finale, Supergirl is exposed to black kryptonite, which creates a clone of her. Her clone ends up in Siberia and is secretly trained by the Soviet military in Kaznia under the codename Snowbird. When the clone is exposed to Kryptonite gas, Lex Luthor cures her and adopts her as Red Daughter. Red Daughter, using the alias Linda Lee, works with Lex until he is arrested. Following this, Red Daughter frames Supergirl by attacking the White House disguised as her. Kara and Lex's sister Lena travel to Kaznia, where they discover Red Daughter's origins. When Kara attempts to convince the President of the United States about Red Daughter's true nature, she is kidnapped and placed in a room with Red Daughter to be executed. However, the clone is exposed to kryptonite while Kara escapes. Red Daughter disguises herself as Kara and threatens her adoptive mother under Lex's orders, who had escaped prison. Kara goes to confront Red Daughter, who supposedly kills her with Lex's help, but Red Daughter later finds out Lex had betrayed Kaznia and framed himself a public hero by killing Red Daughter in front of the world. Red Daughter is revealed to be alive and being held captive at Shelly Island, where he uses her powers, among those of other kidnapped aliens, to power up a satellite to destroy Argo City in order to kill Superman. During a confrontation between Lex and Kara, Red Daughter sacrifices herself to save the latter after learning of the former's true nature.
 A different version of Pyotr Roslov appears in season seven episode "Due Process" of Arrow, portrayed by Bruce Blain. He is a former KGB agent, who works as a criminal and is Anatoly Knyazev's colleague. Pyotr has a connection with Ricardo Diaz and ARGUS sends Anatoly to get a data from his computer in the stockroom storage to discover Diaz's plan. When retrieving data, Pyotr discovers his intentions and intends to kill him, but ARGUS kills all criminals and him. ARGUS discovers that Diaz wanted to buy two aerial explosives from him to destroy Star City.

Animation

Film
 In 2013, James Tucker expressed interest in making an animated movie adaptation of Red Son for DC Universe Animated Original Movies. The animated adaptation of the comic was later released as part of this line above. Jason Isaacs starred as Superman opposite Amy Acker as Lois Lane, Diedrich Bader as Lex Luthor, and Paul Williams as Brainiac, with Roger Craig Smith as Batman and Vanessa Marshall as Wonder Woman. Also appearing are William Salyers as Joseph Stalin, Jim Meskimen as John F. Kennedy, Phil Morris as James Olsen, Sasha Roiz as Hal Jordan, Phil LaMarr as John Stewart, Travis Willingham as Superior Man, and Winter Zoli as Svetlana. Anna Vocino, Greg Chun, Jim Ward and Jason Spisak were also in the film. The film was released digitally on February 25, 2020 and on 4K Ultra HD and Blu-ray on March 17.
 In 2017, Jordan Vogt-Roberts had pitched a live-action adaptation for Superman: Red Son to Warner Bros. Pictures but the studio had passed it on.

Television 
 In the Justice League Action episode "Keeping Up with the Kryptonians", Mr. Mxyzptlk sends Superman to Kasnia, where he becomes a variation of Red Son Superman.

Video games 
 The video game Injustice: Gods Among Us features DLC costumes for Superman, Wonder Woman, Solomon Grundy, Green Lantern, Batman, and Deathstroke as well as missions that are based on the Red Son storyline.
 Said costumes are unlockable in the iOS variation of Injustice: Gods Among Us, again for Superman, Batman, Wonder Woman, Green Lantern, Deathstroke and Solomon Grundy.
 The Red Son SteelBook special edition of Injustice: Gods Among Us, released in the United Kingdom, includes the three character skins for Superman, Wonder Woman and Solomon Grundy and 20 missions set in the Red Son timeline.
 The game Batman: Arkham Origins has the Red Son Batman skin in the game's DLC and is a skin in the iOS version of the game.
 Superman's Red Son outfit appears as a costume variant in Injustice 2. In Green Arrow's ending, the Red Son version of Batman is part of a Multiverse Justice League with Earth-23 Superman, Flashpoint Wonder Woman, and the game's version of Green Arrow.

Miscellaneous 
 As part of its motion comics series, DC/Warner released a 12-part adaptation of the story on iTunes, with a new episode being released every week beginning in late July 2009. The Superman: Red Son motion comic was animated by New Zealand-based Karactaz Animation and featured a select voice cast based in the Los Angeles region. It had received positive reviews from the motion comics community and has since been released in made-to-order DVD form by WBShop.com.

See also
List of Elseworlds publications
Superman: True Brit

References

Further reading
 Zenker, Gary (2013), Ultimate DC Comics Action Figures and Collectibles Checklist, White Lightning Publishing

External links

 
 
  (motion comics adaptation)

Comics by Mark Millar
Comics set in the Soviet Union
Alternate history comics
Fiction set in 1938
Fiction set in 1953
Fiction set in 1978
Fiction set in 2001
Cultural depictions of Joseph Stalin
Cultural depictions of Dwight D. Eisenhower
Cultural depictions of John F. Kennedy
Cultural depictions of Richard Nixon
DC Comics adapted into films